This is a list of Albanian rebels.

Medieval era
Gjergj Kastrioti (1405-1468)
Gjon Kastrioti II (1456-1502)
Ajdin Muzaka (-1444)
Gjon Zenebishi (-1418)
Depë Zenebishi (1379-1435)
Theodor Bua (?-?)
Mark Gjini (?-?)
Pjetër Bua (?-?)

Ottoman period

Mihal Grameno (1871–1931)
Bajo Topulli (1868–1930)
Çerçiz Topulli (1880–1915)
Zenel Gjoleka (1805-1852)
Çelo Picari (1801-1880)
Tafil Buzi (1792-1844)
Dervish Cara (-1844)
Mic Sokoli (1839-1881)
Zhuj Selmani (1844-1875)
Rrapo Hekali (-1875)
Hodo Nivica (1809-1852)
Hasan Prishtina (1873-1933)
Menduh Zavalani (1889-1914)
Ded Gjo Luli (1840-1915)
Sokol Baci (1837-1920)
Mehmet Shpendi (1851-1915)
Luigj Gurakuqi (1879-1925)
Pretash Zeka Ulaj (1882-1962)
Tringe Smajli (1880-1917)

Kachak movement

Bajram Curri (1862–1925)
Azem Galica (1889–1924)
Qerime Shotë Galica (1895–1927) 
Zef Kol Ndoka (1883-1924)
Hysni Curri (?-1925)
Ajet Sopi Bllata (1861–1938) 
Agan Koja  (1892-1929)
Mehmet Pashë Deralla (1843-1918)
Sali Butka (1852-1938)
Osman Taka (1848-1887)
Asllan Curri (?-1925)
Idriz Seferi (1847-1927)
Bajram Balota (?-?)
Sadik Rama (1879 – 1944)
Isa Boletini (1864-1916)
Jusuf Mehoniqi (1883-1926)
Elez Isufi (1861–1924)
Qazim Begolli (?-?)
Musa Demi (1878–1971)

Partisan movement
Asim Zeneli
Koçi Bako
Bardhok Biba
Ali Demi
Emin Duraku
Ymer Dishnica
Pirro Dodbiba
Petrit Dume
Llazar Fundo
Mustafa Gjinishi
Kadri Hazbiu
Branko Kadia
Jordan Misja
Perlat Rexhepi
Hysni Kapo
Abdyl Këllezi
Ali Kelmendi
Bilbil Klosi
Androkli Kostallari
Vojo Kushi
Pirro Kondi
Baba Faja Martaneshi
Myslim Peza
Vasil Shanto
Zef Mala
Petro Marko
Spiro Moisiu
Misto Mame
Haxhi Lleshi
Foto Çami
Prokop Murra
Manush Myftiu
Adil Çarçani
Hito Çako
Ramadan Çitaku
Riza Dani
Vito Kapo
Liri Gega
Naxhije Dume
Liri Gero (1926–1944) 
Melpomeni Çobani
Dhora Leka
Ramize Gjebrea
Nexhmije Hoxha
Margarita Tutulani
Liri Belishova
Sofia Noti

Ballist movement
Prek Cali (1872-1945)
Skënder Muço (1904–1944)
Vasil Andoni
Hafëz Jusuf Azemi
Bislim Bajgora
Safet Butka
Aziz Çami
Gajur Deralla
Muharrem Bajraktari
Fiqri Dine
Abas Ermenji
Hasan Dosti
Ndok Gjeloshi
Xhem Hasa
Rexhep Jusufi
Kristo Kirka
Ndue Përlleshi
Mefail Shehu

Yugoslav wars

Adem Jashari (1955–1998)
 Shkelqim Hasani 
Tahir Meha (1943-1981)
Hamëz Jashari (1950-1998)
Zahir Pajaziti (1962-1997)
Sali Çekaj (1956-1999)
Bekim Berisha (1966-1998)
Agim Ramadani (1963-1999)
Ramush Haradinaj (1968-)
Daut Haradinaj
Fatmir Limaj (1971-)
Ismet Asllani
Agim Çeku (1960-)
Hashim Thaçi (1968-)
Mujdin Aliu (1974-1999)
Fadil Nimani
Ali Ahmeti
Rahim Beqiri
Tahir Sinani
Skerdilajd Llagami
Talat Xhaferi
Njazi Azemi
Haradin Bala
Rrustem Berisha
Lahi Brahimaj
Indrit Cara
Haki Demolli
Bahri Fazliu
Adem Grabovci
Ismet Jashari
Jakup Krasniqi
Luan Haradinaj
Naim Maloku
Albesian Mataj
Isak Musliu
Selim Pacolli
Anton Quni
Salih Mustafa
Jashar Salihu
Sylejman Selimi
Shkelzën Haradinaj
Abdullah Tahiri
Kadri Veseli
Emin Xhinovci
Tahir Zemaj

References

Rebels
Rebels

Rebels